The 1963 World Netball Championships was the first edition of the INF Netball World Cup, a quadrennial international netball competition. It was held from 2 August to 14 August and in Eastbourne, England. It featured 11 teams. In a round robin style format, Australia won all of their matches and considered the inaugural title holders.

Round-Robin
All of the matches were played on British Summer Time.

Round 1

Round 2

Round 3

Round 4

Round 5

Round 6

Round 7

Round 8

Round 9

Round 10

Round 11

Final placings

Medallists

References

  
1963
Netball
1963 in netball
International netball competitions hosted by England
Sport in Eastbourne
20th century in East Sussex
August 1963 sports events in the United Kingdom